is a Japanese actress. She has appeared in more than 60 films since 1996.

Awards
Watanabe was given the award for best script at the 1999 Mainichi Film Awards for M/Other with director Nobuhiro Suwa and co-star Tomokazu Miura for dialogue that was mostly improvised on the set.

Selected filmography

Film

Television

References

External links
 

1968 births
Living people
Actresses from Tokyo
Japanese female models
Japanese film actresses
Japanese television actresses
Best Supporting Actress Asian Film Award winners
20th-century Japanese actresses
21st-century Japanese actresses